Two Arabian Knights (1927) is an American silent comedy film, directed by Lewis Milestone and starring William Boyd, Mary Astor, and Louis Wolheim. The film was produced by Howard Hughes and was distributed by United Artists. The screenwriters were James T. O'Donohue, Wallace Smith, and George Marion Jr.

The film won the only Academy Award for Best Comedy Direction in 1929. The next year, AMPAS merged the categories Best Director of a Comedy Picture and Best Director of a Dramatic Picture to form the category Academy Award for Best Director.

Plot

During the First World War, two American soldiers become trapped in no man's land. Expecting to die, W. Dangerfield Phelps III (William Boyd) decides to fulfill his fondest desire: to beat up his sergeant since training camp, Peter O'Gaffney (Louis Wolheim).  While they are brawling, the Germans sneak up and capture them.

In a German prison camp, the two become friends when Phelps takes responsibility for an unflattering caricature he drew of a guard, rather than let O'Gaffney take the blame. The two escape, stealing the white robes of Arab prisoners to blend in with the snow. However, they encounter (and are forced to join) a group of similarly garbed Arab prisoners being sent by train to Constantinople.

Near the end of their journey, Phelps creates a distraction, and the two men jump off, landing in a hay wagon. When the hay is loaded onto a ship bound for Arabia, so are they. The stowaways are discovered, but the skipper (Michael Visaroff) is satisfied when Phelps pays him their fare.

When a small boat founders nearby, Phelps jumps in to try to rescue an Arabian woman, Mirza (Mary Astor). Both he and the woman have to be saved by O'Gaffney. The two soldiers and the skipper vie for the veiled woman's affections. Phelps eventually coaxes her into removing her veil, and is entranced by her beauty. Meanwhile, the woman's escort observes this development with disapproval. The skipper insists on being paid for Mirza's fare, but none of the three have any money left. They hold him off as best they can.

When they reach their destination, the skipper refuses to let Mirza debark without paying, so O'Gaffney robs the purser (Boris Karloff) to get the money. Mirza is met by Shevket Ben Ali (Ian Keith); Mirza informs Phelps that her father has arranged for her to marry Shevket. They depart. The Americans jump overboard when the skipper discovers what happened to his purser.

The two men head for the American consul, but leave hastily without speaking to him when they find the skipper already there lodging a complaint. They decide to seek the assistance of Mirza's father the Emir, who turns out to be the governor of the region. However, Mirza's escort has told him and Shevket that Phelps has seen her without her veil. Outraged, the Emir sends his men to bring the Americans back to be executed. Unaware of this, the two soldiers saunter into the Emir's palace. Phelps reads Mirza's warning note in time, and the two escape.

When Phelps sets out to rescue Mirza, O'Gaffney shows true friendship and accompanies him. They are trapped by Shevket and his men, but when Mirza threatens to kill herself, Shevket proposes they settle this with a duel in which only one of the pistols is loaded. Phelps agrees and fires first; his gun is unloaded. Mirza is made to leave the room. Then Shevket reveals that both guns are empty; he did not wish to wager his life with a "dog". He exits, leaving his men to dispose of Phelps. The two men overcome their captors, relieve Shevket of Mirza, and ride away.

Cast

 William Boyd as W. Dangerfield Phelps III
 Mary Astor as Mirza
 Louis Wolheim as Sgt. Peter O'Gaffney
 Ian Keith as Shevket Ben Ali
 Michael Vavitch as The Emir
 Michael Visaroff as The Skipper
 Boris Karloff as The Purser
 DeWitt Jennings as American Consul
 Nicholas Dunaew as Mirza's Man Servant
 Jean Vachon as Mirza's Maid Servant
 David Cavendish as The Emir's Advisor

Production
The movie was filmed in the United States. Roughly four months after the film's premiere, it was reported that director Lewis Milestone had been hired primarily on the basis of his work on Harold Lloyd's The Kid Brother (1927).

Preservation
The film was long thought lost before being located in Howard Hughes' film collection after his death. Two Arabian Knights was preserved by the Academy Film Archive, in partnership with University of Nevada, Las Vegas, in 2016.

See also
 Boris Karloff filmography
 List of rediscovered films

References

Further reading
 Wolf, Howard (May 7, 1928). "'Hairy Ape' Learns Where He Belongs". The Akron Beacon Journal. p. 5

External links

 
 
 
 
 original Lobby card

1927 romantic comedy films
American romantic comedy films
American silent feature films
American black-and-white films
Films directed by Lewis Milestone
Films whose director won the Best Directing Academy Award
World War I films set in the Middle East
World War I prisoner of war films
Films produced by Howard Hughes
1920s rediscovered films
Rediscovered American films
1920s American films
Silent romantic comedy films
Silent war films
Silent American comedy films